Elizabeth Corso (born July 10, 2003) is an American Paralympic middle-distance runner. She represented the United States at the 2020 Summer Paralympics.

Career
Corso represented the United States in the women's 1500 metres T13 event at the 2020 Summer Paralympics and won a silver medal.

Personal life
Corso was born with albinism and is legally blind with 20/200 vision.

References

2003 births
Living people
American female middle-distance runners
People from Newmarket, New Hampshire
People with albinism
Paralympic track and field athletes of the United States
Athletes (track and field) at the 2020 Summer Paralympics
Medalists at the 2020 Summer Paralympics
Paralympic silver medalists for the United States
Paralympic medalists in athletics (track and field)
21st-century American women